The Federal Inventory of Landscapes and Natural Monuments in Switzerland aims to protect landscapes of national importance. The inventory is part of a 1977 Ordinance of the Swiss Federal Council implementing the Federal Law on the Protection of Nature and Cultural Heritage.

The sites are of three types:
Unique objects
Typical landscapes
Natural monuments

The inventory currently includes approx. 160 sites (1977: initially 65 sites, 1983: +55, 1996: +33, 1998: +9) covering 7806 km² (approximately 20 percent of Switzerland).

Inventory

History 

Between 1958 and 1963, the Swiss League for the Protection of Nature, together with the Swiss Heritage Society and the Swiss Alpine Club, established an inventory of landscapes and natural sites of national importance. Based on it, the Swiss Confederation published the Federal Inventory of Landscapes and Natural Monuments in 1977.

References

 
 Federal Inventory of Landscape and Natural Monuments of National Importance

See also 
 Environmental movement in Switzerland
 Nature parks in Switzerland

External links
 Federal Commission for the Protection of Nature and Cultural Heritage (ENHK): Landscapes and natural monuments
 EUNIS: Switzerland - Landscapes and Natural Monuments of National Importance (CH08), Common Database on Designated Areas (CDDA)
 Map 
 

Landscapes and Natural Monuments
Landscapes and Natural Monuments
Nature conservation in Switzerland
Cultural heritage of Switzerland